Mugguru Monagallu is a 1994 Indian Telugu-language action comedy film directed by K. Raghavendra Rao and produced by Chiranjeevi's younger brothers Nagendra Babu and Pawan Kalyan. This film stars Chiranjeevi in a triple role, Ramya Krishna, Nagma and Roja. The music and background score were composed by Vidyasagar. The film was released on 7 January 1994.

Plot 

Prudhvi, Vikram and Dattatreya (Chiranjeevi in a triple role) are the sons of Ranganath and Srividya living in a village. Ranganath goes against Sarath Saxena in an incident and is killed by him. Srividya, who is pregnant with twins, is separated from Prudhvi. She thinks that he is killed while escaping from the goons and delivers the twins in a temple. The priest who is childless adopts one son and Srividya is left with Vikram, who becomes an Assistant Commissioner of Police. Dattatreya is a Dance master. The story revolves on how the brothers unite with one another and also with their mother and take revenge on the villains.

Cast
 Chiranjeevi as Prudhvi, Vikram and Dattathreya
 Ramya Krishna as Nagamani, Dattathreya's girl friend (Voice over by Roja Ramani)
 Nagma as Rani, Vikram's lover (Voice over by Roja Ramani)
 Roja as Seeta, Pruthvi's wife (Voice over by Roja Ramani)
 Srividya as Vikram, Dattathreya, Prudhvi's mother
 Ranganath as Prudhvi's father
 Sharat Saxena as Banerjee
 Salim Ghouse
 Kota Srinivasa Rao
 Brahmanandam as Sarva Mangalam
 Ponnambalam
 Kantharao as Dattatreya's father
 Sudhakar

Soundtrack
The music and background score for the movie were composed by  Vidyasagar.

Telugu version

Tamil version

Release
The film was dubbed and released in Tamil as Alex Pandian. A critic noted "this movie marked the decline of the superstar in Andhra, and rightly so."

References

External links 
 
 http://musicmazaa.com/telugu/audiosongs/movie/Mugguru+Monagallu.html

1990s Telugu-language films
1994 films
Films directed by K. Raghavendra Rao
Films scored by Vidyasagar
Twins in Indian films